Trechus uyttenboogaarti is a species of ground beetle in the subfamily Trechinae. It was described by Jeannel in 1936.

References

uyttenboogaarti
Beetles described in 1936